Juan María Alcedo Serrano (born 5 February 2001) is a Spanish footballer who plays as a left back for Albacete Balompié.

Club career
Born in Rota, Andalusia, Alcedo joined Sevilla FC's youth setup in 2016, after representing Atlético Sanluqueño CF and CD Rota. He made his senior debut with the reserves on 1 November 2020, coming on as a late substitute in a 1–1 Segunda División B away draw against Real Murcia.

On 7 July 2022, Alcedo signed a three-year contract with Albacete Balompié, newly-promoted to Segunda División. He made his professional debut on 20 August, replacing Maikel Mesa in a 0–0 home draw against Burgos CF.

References

External links

2001 births
Living people
People from Rota, Andalusia
Sportspeople from the Province of Cádiz
Spanish footballers
Footballers from Andalusia
Association football defenders
Segunda División players
Primera Federación players
Segunda División B players
Tercera División players
Sevilla FC C players
Sevilla Atlético players
Albacete Balompié players
Spain youth international footballers